Cereus lanosus or  is a species of columnar cactus found in Central, Cordillera, Concepción, and Paraguarí departments of Paraguay. The plant is found growing in rocky hills at elevations of 250 and 300 meters.

References

External links
 
 

lanosus